Magnus Theiste (1725-1791) was a Norwegian government official. He served as the County Governor of Lister og Mandal county from 1768 to 1771 and of Nordre Bergenhus county from 1771 to 1779.

He was the son of Jacob Monsen Theiste, a timber trader from Christiania and his second wife, Anna Beata Sørensdatter (née Løchstør). He was born in Christiania in 1725. He attended the City School in 1744 and after graduation, he traveled abroad. In 1768, he was appointed as the County Governor of Lister og Mandals amt. In 1771, he was reassigned and he became the County Governor of Nordre Bergenhus amt.

During his time in Nordre Bergenhus, he came into some disagreements with Nicolai Frederik Krogh, the roads director for the county. They disagreed over a bridge and in 1773 and it was so bad that royal intervention was required to settle the matter. Some time later, residents of the county sent formal complaints to the King about his work. On 29 June 1776, a letter from the King suspended part of his salary. An appointed commission investigated the situation and sentenced him to a fine. Soon after, Theiste sent the Diocesan Governor Christian de Schouboe 40 Danish rigsdaler with a request for a favorable declaration in connection with the complaint received. Later, the Supreme Court sentenced him be removed from his office because of trying to pay off the governor. He left office on 23 November 1779. In 1780, however, he received the remainder of his salary for the year plus he was awarded an annual pension of 300 Danish rigsdaler because the sentence was deemed to be somewhat strict in relation to the offense.

He died in Copenhagen on 25 November 1791. Theiste never married.

References

1725 births
1791 deaths
County governors of Norway